Ideal Institute of Management and Technology & School of Law is a postsecondary institution in Karkardooma, an area of Delhi, India, founded in 1999 by the New Millennium Education Society & affiliated to GGSIPU, Delhi,  Approved by Bar Council of India. Accredited by NAAC and An ISO 9001:2015 Certified Institution.

It offers courses leading to the degrees of BBA (CAM), BBA and LL.B.(H) from Guru Gobind Singh Indraprastha University, Delhi. The institute has been consistently ranked as one of the best institutions affiliated to GGSIPU.

References

External links
 

Law schools in Delhi
Guru Gobind Singh Indraprastha University
Educational institutions established in 1999
1999 establishments in Delhi